The Lemon Twigs are an American rock band from Long Island, New York, fronted by brothers Brian (b. March 21, 1997) and Michael D'Addario (b. March 3, 1999). Both brothers are vocalists, songwriters and multi-instrumentalists.

History

Early childhood 
Brian and Michael were born two years apart from each other, both in March. Ronnie D'Addario, their father, is a musician and songwriter from Manhattan who played with Irish folk singer Tommy Makem. Susan Hall, their mother, is a neuropsychologist from Ohio who pursued acting and entertainment in her younger years. The first few years of the D'Addario brothers' lives were spent in an apartment in Flushing, Queens. The family moved to a house in the suburbs of Long Island soon after the children were born. The brothers were raised in a musical household and learned to play and sing at a very early age.

Formation and first years 
Brian and Michael D'Addario had extensive stage experience as children. Brian played Gavroche in Les Miserables and Flounder in The Little Mermaid on Broadway. Michael appeared in The Coast of Utopia, The Radio City Christmas Spectacular, and the 2008 production of All My Sons. Michael also appeared in a variety of television shows and films, such as John Adams on HBO, Are We There Yet? on TBS, and the 2012 films People Like Us and Sinister. The Lemon Twigs were founded by the brothers while they were both students at Hicksville High School on Long Island, New York. The siblings both perform lead vocals, lead guitar, drums and other instruments.

Their first release was the cassette What We Know, issued in a limited edition of 100 copies (with digital download) in 2015 by Winspear.

2016–2018: Do Hollywood 
On their first generally released album, Do Hollywood, each brother took the lead on vocals and guitar on the songs he composed; during live performances, this setup was preserved, with the remaining D'Addario playing the drums, and fellow schoolmates Megan Zeankowski and Danny Ayala (who have played with the D'Addarios on and off since their youth) playing bass and keyboards, respectively. Ayala also sang backing vocals. The album, produced by Jonathan Rado of Foxygen, was recorded in the spring of 2015, with the members being only 15 and 17 at the time of its creation.

The Lemon Twigs served as opening act for fellow New York City/Long Island-based alt-rockers Sunflower Bean on their East Coast tour in late 2016 and performed on television programs like The Tonight Show Starring Jimmy Fallon, CBS This Morning "Saturday Sessions" and Conan along the way. In early 2017 it was announced that the band would play on day one of the Coachella Valley Music and Arts Festival in Indio, California on April 14, 2017. This performance saw the Twigs joined by one of the band's "favorite musicians ever, in the whole world", Todd Rundgren, to play "Couldn't I Just Tell You" from Rundgren's classic 1972 double album, Something/Anything?. The Lemon Twigs released the Do Hollywood tracks "These Words" and "As Long As We're Together" as a double-A-side single, and made videos for both songs. The third single was the album opener, "I Wanna Prove to You", with a video directed by Nick Roney.

The band played at several major festivals in the summer of 2017, such as Glastonbury, Outside Lands, Lollapalooza, Austin City, and the Montreux, in addition to opening for Phoenix across the United States. These 2017 shows saw the band covering songs such as "Fish and Whistle" by John Prine, "I Walked with a Zombie" by Roky Erickson, "You Can't Talk to the Dude" by Jonathan Richman, "I've Begun To Fall In Love" by R. Stevie Moore, "Love Stepped Out" by their father, Ronnie D'Addario, and "I Can Feel the Fire" by Ronnie Wood; they notably performed the latter song with Thomas Hedlund of Phoenix on drums while supporting Phoenix at the Hollywood Bowl alongside Mac DeMarco. In September 2017 the band released an EP, Brothers of Destruction, containing songs recorded during the Do Hollywood sessions.

2018-2019: Go to School 
The band's second album, Go To School, a musical about a chimpanzee raised as a human boy, was released on August 24, 2018. The album debuted at #93 on the UK Albums chart on September 6, 2018. The band were also announced as one of the support acts for Arctic Monkeys' 2018 tour in support of their album Tranquility Base Hotel & Casino.

Prior to beginning their run of shows promoting Go To School, the group underwent a number of personnel changes. Both Megan Zeankowski and Danny Ayala were replaced by Daryl Johns (bass), Andres Valbuena (drums) and Tommaso Taddonio (keyboards).

2020: Songs for the General Public 
On March 2, 2020, the band announced that Songs for the General Public, their third studio album, was scheduled to be released on May 1, 2020. The single "The One" was released the same day. However, due to complications of the COVID-19 pandemic, the album's release was changed to August 21, 2020.

Collaborations 
The Lemon Twigs played on Foxygen's 2017 album Hang, credited as playing drums, percussion, acoustic and electric guitar, bass guitar, piano and organ.
They also were players on Weyes Blood's Titanic Rising, released in 2019 via Sub Pop records. Michael played drums on 3 of the tracks, while Brian played guitar, bass, piano and synthesizer on five tracks; he is also credited with production on "Mirror Forever" and providing the string arrangement to album opener "A Lot's Gonna Change", and instrumental closer "Nearer To Thee."
The Lemon Twigs performed on many tracks for Tim Heidecker's album Fear of Death, released on September 25, 2020, alongside Weyes Blood. They are credited for playing bass guitar, acoustic and electric guitar, drums, vocals, and mellotron.

Style 
The Times characterized The Lemon Twigs as "a modern-day band combining the melodic, harmony-rich soft rock of Wings and Supertramp, the underground cool of Big Star and the Ramones, and the theatricality of Broadway musicals."  The Guardian cited the "humbling beauty of their songs" and their "sumptuous harmonies." The band was signed to British alternative music label 4AD in 2015. Their debut album, Do Hollywood, was released in October 2016 to critical acclaim. A number of diverse pop music figures have publicly expressed admiration for the Twigs: Elton John, The Zombies, Boy George, Laura Marling, Gilbert O'Sullivan, Gary Brooker, Marc Almond, Iggy Pop, Todd Rundgren, Flea, and Gerard Way.
 

Their musical style has been described as indie rock, power pop, glam rock, indie pop, baroque rock, and art rock.

Band members

Current members
 Brian D'Addario – vocals, guitar, bass, keyboards, drums, trumpet, violin (2014–present)
 Michael D'Addario – vocals, guitar, bass, keyboards, drums, percussion (2014–present)

Touring members
 Will Berman — drums, guitar, keyboards (2022–) 
 James Richardson — bass, synth, vocals (2022–) 

Former touring members
 Danny Ayala – keyboards, vocals, drums, guitar (2014–2017)
 Daryl Johns – bass, vocals (2018–2021)
 Tommaso Taddonio – keyboards (2018–2021)
 Andres Valbuena – drums (2018–2021)
 Megan Zeankowski – bass (2014–2017)

Discography

Studio albums
 What We Know (2015, limited-edition cassette)
 Do Hollywood (2016)
 Go to School (2018)
 Songs for the General Public (2020)
 Everything Harmony (2023)

EPs
 Brothers of Destruction (2017)

Singles
 "These Words"/"As Long as We're Together" (2016)
 "I Wanna Prove to You" (2017)
 "Night Song" (2017)
 "Why Didn't You Say That" (2017)
 "Foolin' Around"/"Tailor Made" (2018)
 "If You Give Enough" (2018)
 "Small Victories" (2018)
 "The Fire" (2018)
 "The One" (2020)
 "Moon" (2020)
 "Live in Favor of Tomorrow" (2020)
 "No One Holds You Closer (Than The One You Haven’t Met)" (2020)
 “Corner of My Eye” (2023)
 “Any Time of Day” (2023)
 "In My Head" (2023)

Live albums
 The Lemon Twigs LIVE (2020)

References

External links
 New band of the week: The Lemon Twigs (The Guardian, July 18, 2016)
 Brian D'Addario at IMDb
 Michael D'Addario at IMDb
 Randall Colburn, The Lemon Twigs provide a Track By Track breakdown of their new concept album, Go to School
 Ronnie D'Addario Website

2015 establishments in New York City
Sibling musical duos
4AD artists
Indie rock musical groups from New York (state)
American power pop groups
American art rock groups
Musical groups established in 2015
Musical groups from Long Island
People from Hicksville, New York